Dragon Creek, also called Kocaçay or Anamur Creek, is a creek in Anamur district of Mersin Province, southern Turkey.

Geography
The short creek is in Anamur district of Mersin Province. A  part of the stream to the north of the historical bridge Alaköprü is a popular rafting course.

Hydrology
The highest flow rates are in the spring, and fall to a minimum during the late summer months.

Cyprus water supply network

Dragon Creek is the source of the -long undersea pipeline to Cyprus as to support the Cyprus water supply network. The reservoir is Alaköprü Dam. Because of this project Akine, Ormancık and Sarıağaç villages, which were around the creek were relocated by the government.

References

Geography of Mersin Province
Anamur District
Rivers of Turkey